In Mandaeism, Sam Ziwa is an uthra (angel or guardian) from the World of Light. Sam Ziwa is considered to be the Mandaean equivalent of Shem.

Sam Mana Smira
Sam Ziwa may be identified with Sam Mana Smira (Smir Ziwa 'pure first Radiance', or Sam Smir Ziwa; Smir means 'preserved'), an uthra is mentioned in Qolasta prayers 9, 14, 28, 77, and 171, and Right Ginza 3 and 5.4. Yawar Mana Smira and Sam Smira Ziwa are mentioned in Right Ginza 14. Lidzbarski (1920) translates Sam Mana Smira as "Sām, the well-preserved Mānā."

See also
 List of angels in theology

References

Uthras
Hebrew Bible people in Mandaeism
Shem
Individual angels